Samuel Robin Spark (9 July 1938 – 6 August 2016) was a Scottish artist. He was the son of Sidney Oswald Spark and writer Muriel Spark.

Prolific in his work, he created more than 1,000 paintings, photographs, and short texts and articles about art, Jewish culture, and his own family.

Early life
Spark was born in Southern Rhodesia, then a British colony, to Sidney and Muriel Spark. His parents had met in Edinburgh at a dance, and his father had later travelled to Southern Rhodesia, where he worked as a teacher. Muriel had joined Sidney in 1937, and Robin was born the following July in Bulawayo. The marriage soon deteriorated, however, as Sidney, who was 13 years Muriel's senior, suffered from manic depression and had violent tendencies. Sidney refused to divorce Muriel, so Muriel left him, taking Robin with her. They moved first to Cape Town, living in a flat below Princess Frederica of Greece and the young Constantine.

Towards the end of the Second World War, Muriel managed to travel back to the United Kingdom by means of a troop ship, but was unable to secure passage for the four-year-old Robin, who was left in a convent school. In September 1945 Muriel brought Robin to Edinburgh. She then went to London to seek work, leaving Robin to be raised by Muriel's parents, the Cambergs, in their flat in Morningside/Bruntsfield.

Muriel Spark converted to Catholicism in 1954, but Robin chose to remain loyal to Judaism, much to his grandparents' satisfaction. Muriel did not attend his Bar Mitzvah in 1952, but sent 50 pounds for the party afterwards.

Education and careers
Robin was educated at the private Daniel Stewart's College in Edinburgh. He left at the age of 16 to pursue a career in the retail jewellery trade. He served his National Service in the Royal Army Medical Corps from 1957 to 1959, after which he studied at night school in order to obtain his Highers. In the late 1960s he entered the Civil Service, in which he worked for 20 years in a variety of departments, ending up as Chief Clerk to the Scottish Law Commission.

Despite having never studied art, Spark had always had an interest in the subject and became convinced that he had to pursue a career in it. Udi Merioz, an international artist who was a friend of Robin's, encouraged him to try to get into a college, so he started to attend evening classes at the art college and prepared a portfolio for entrance as a full-time student. He was offered a place at the Edinburgh College of Art and started the four-year course in 1983, graduating with a BA (Hons). He was then awarded an Andrew Grant Scholarship and became an art tutor while continuing his own painting.

In 1989, Spark was awarded an Israel Zangwill scholarship.

Abstract and figurative work

Spark expressed emotion through his predominantly figurative work. He intuitively took liberties with perspective and proportions where doing so helped the composition.

There is a strong Jewish feeling in some of his pictures because of his education and family background, and he always signed his paintings in Hebrew. His work also shows the influence of the  Scottish Colourists, and an interest in the underlying bone and muscle structure of the human body. In his later years his work moved into pure abstract symbolism. Spark used pastels on paper and impasto.

Solo exhibitions
 Stenberg Centre for Judaism, London & University Staff Club, Edinburgh
 Richard Demarco Gallery, Edinburgh
 Jewish Festival Exhibition, Edinburgh Hebrew Congregation Community Centre
 Leith A1 Gallery and Marchmont Studios, Edinburgh
 Pen & Ink Miniatures, Kelly's Gallery, Edinburgh
 Peter Potter Gallery, Haddington & Rachel's, Royal Botanic Gardens, Edinburgh International Festival
 The Brass Rail & La Grande Cafetier, Edinburgh
 Dunedin Gallery, Edinburgh
 Creelers, Edinburgh
 Lyceum Theatre, Edinburgh
 Leo Beck center London
 W.A.S.P.S., Studios Patriothall Gallery

Works shown
Royal Academy, Royal Scottish Academy, Heriot-Watt University, The Chantry, Co. Wexford, City of Aberdeen Art Gallery, Blue & White Gallery & Associates, Jerusalem, Florida, Buenos Aires, Royal Scottish Society of Painters in Watercolours, Edinburgh Printmakers' workshop, Morrison (Portraiture) Award, Hebrew Society of Argentina sparing 1992 Art Exhibition, Society of Scottish Artists, WASPS.

Permanent collections
 Heriot-Watt University
 Sternberg Centre
 Edinburgh College of Art
 Edinburgh Hebrew Congregation
 National Portrait Gallery of Scotland
 Blue & White Gallery
 St. Mary's Music School in Edinburgh.

Tutorial career
 Israel – Blue & White Gallery, Jerusalem.
 Edinburgh – Marchmont Studio and Gillis Centre Studio.
 Lectures on Jews Art EJLS, Council for Christians and Jews and Garnet Hill Centre, Glasgow. 
 Art Tutor Boroughmuir and various schools and community centres, Edinburgh.

Personal life
Spark and his mother Muriel at times had a strained relationship. They had a falling out when Robin's Orthodox Judaism prompted him to petition for his late great-grandmother to be recognized as Jewish. (Muriel's maternal grandparents, Adelaide Hyams and Tom Uezzell, had married in a church. Tom was Anglican. Adelaide's father was Jewish, but her mother was not; Adelaide referred to herself as a "Jewish Gentile.") Muriel reacted by accusing him of seeking publicity to further his career as an artist. Muriel's brother Philip, who himself had become actively Jewish, agreed with her version of the family's history.  During one of her last book signings in Edinburgh, she told a journalist who asked if she would see her son again: "I think I know how best to avoid him by now."

References

External links 
 Web | www.samuelrobinspark.com
 Obituary: Samuel Robin Spark, Artist. The Scotsman | Scotland's National Newspaper | 15 August 2016 

1938 births
2016 deaths
Alumni of the Edinburgh College of Art
Rhodesian painters
Scottish artists
Scottish Jews
Scottish people of Lithuanian-Jewish descent
Rhodesian emigrants to South Africa
Rhodesian emigrants to the United Kingdom
Zimbabwean people of Scottish descent
White Rhodesian people
Rhodesian Jews
Converts to Judaism